Carina Leagues Club Tigers, also known as CLC Tigers, are an Australian netball team based in East Brisbane. Their senior team plays in the HART Sapphire Series. They also enter teams in Netball Queensland's Ruby Series as well as under-18 and under-16 competitions. The team represents Brisbane East Netball and historically has been known as Brisbane East Tigers. They adopted their current name in 2005 after the Carina Leagues Club became the teams naming rights sponsor.

History
Carina Leagues Club Tigers have competed in a series of state leagues organised by Netball Queensland, including the Holden Astra Cup, the Holden Cruze Cup, the Queensland Champions Cup and the Queensland State Netball League. In 2019, along with Bond University Bull Sharks, Brisbane North Cougars, Ipswich Jets, USC Thunder, Northern Rays and QUT Wildcats, Tigers were founding members of the HART Sapphire Series.

Grand finals

Division 1
Holden Astra Cup

Holden Cruze Cup

Queensland Champions Cup

Mission Queensland State Netball League Division 1

Division 2
Ruby Series

Notable players

Internationals

 Gabi Simpson
 Stephanie Wood

 Hayley Mulheron

Queensland Firebirds
 Beryl Friday
 Abigail Latu-Meafou
 Jacqui Russell
 Gabi Simpson
 Katie Walker

Sunshine Coast Lightning
 Jacqui Russell
 Stephanie Wood

Captains

Premierships
Division 1
Winners: 2008, 2012, 2014       
Runners Up: 2011, 2013, 2015, 2016, 2017 
Division 2
Winners: 2019, 2020  
Runners Up: 2021

References

External links
   Brisbane East Netball - Home of the Carina Leagues Club Tigers on Facebook
   Brisbane East Netball on Twitter

Netball teams in Queensland
Sporting clubs in Brisbane
Queensland state netball league teams